Atractodenchelys is a genus of eels in the cutthroat eel family, Synaphobranchidae.

Species
There are currently two recognized species in this genus:

 Atractodenchelys phrix C. H. Robins & C. R. Robins, 1970
 Atractodenchelys robinsorum Karmovskaya, 2003

References

Synaphobranchidae